T37 may refer to:

Vehicles 
 T-37A tank, a Soviet amphibious light tank of the 1930s
 T37 light tank, preliminary light tank design for the M41 Walker Bulldog
 Cessna T-37 Tweet, a Cessna trainer aircraft
 Prussian T 37, a 1904 German steam locomotives model
 Slingsby T.37 Skylark 1, a British glider

Other uses 
 T37 (classification), a para-athletics classification for track athletes with cerebral palsy
 T.37, an ITU standard which deals with sending fax messages using email
 T-37 (rocket), a demolition rocket used by the U.S. Army during World War Two
 Goldthwaite Municipal Airport, in Goldthwaite, Texas (FAA location identifier)